Bob Holman is an American poet and poetry activist, most closely identified with the oral tradition, the spoken word, and poetry slam. As a promoter of poetry in many media, Holman has spent the last four decades working variously as an author, editor, publisher, performer, emcee of live events, director of theatrical productions, producer of films and television programs, record label executive, university professor, and archivist. He was described by Henry Louis Gates Jr. in The New Yorker as "the postmodern promoter who has done more to bring poetry to cafes and bars than anyone since Ferlinghetti."

Early years
Holman was born in LaFollette, Tennessee in 1948 and raised in Harlan, Kentucky, the child of "a coal miner's daughter and the only Jew in town." His father committed suicide when Holman was two. After his mother remarried, Holman was raised in rural Ohio. He attended Columbia College and graduated in 1970 with a degree in English. At Columbia, Holman studied with Kenneth Koch, Eric Bentley, and Michael Wood but claims that his "major poetry schooling," was "the Lower East Side, with Allen Ginsberg, John Giorno, Anne Waldman, Miguel Piñero, Hettie Jones, Ed Sanders, Amiri Baraka, Ted Berrigan, Alice Notley, Pedro Pietri, David Henderson, Steve Cannon, et al."

Live poetry

St. Mark's Poetry Project
Since its founding by Paul Blackburn in 1966, the St. Mark's Poetry Project in New York has been (according to John Ashbery) "a major force in contemporary American literature."  Holman coordinated the readings at the Poetry Project from 1977 through 1984 and was on the Project's board of directors from 1980 through 1984.

Words to Go
As part of the Cultural Council Foundation's CETA Artists Project, Holman participated in "Words to Go," a mobile troupe of writers and poets that toured New York City in 1978 and 1979. Other members of the troupe included Sandra María Esteves, Roland Legiardi-Laura, Madeleine Keller, Nathan Whiting and Cassia Berman. An anthology of these poems, edited by Bob Stokes, was published by CCF.

Nuyorican Poets Café
Since its founding by Miguel Algarín in 1973, the Nuyorican Poets Café's purpose "has always been to provide a stage for the artists traditionally under-represented in the mainstream media and culture." As co-director of the Nuyorican, Holman introduced slam poetry to the café in 1988 and emceed the venue's slams through 1996. In 1993, he founded the Nuyorican Poets Café Live!, a touring company of poets.

"Aloud! Voices from the Nuyorican Poets Café"
Holman and Algarin were co-editors of the anthology entitled "Aloud! Voices from the Nuyorican Poets Café." Published in 1994, "Aloud!" was a winner of the 1994 American Book Award from the Before Columbus Foundation.

Bowery Poetry Club
Holman is the founder and proprietor of the Bowery Poetry Club, which opened to the public in September 2002. Billed as "a Home for Poetry," the club sponsors poetry events every night, and workshops and readings in the afternoons. In an interview with The New York Times shortly after the club's opening, Holman said, "They say no one has ever gone broke running a bar in New York, but we're going to give it a shot." In 2004 the club won a Village Award from the Greenwich Village Society for Historic Preservation. The awards are given "to help . . . recognize the people, places, and businesses that make a significant contribution to the legendary quality of life in Greenwich Village, The East Village and NoHo."

Bowery Poetry Books
In conjunction with YBK Publishers, Holman founded Bowery Poetry Books in 2005. Since then the imprint has published 13 titles, including works by Taylor Mead, Janet Hamill, Fay Chiang, Paul L. Mills and Black Cracker. It also published an anthology entitled "The Bowery Bartenders Big Book of Poems."

Bowery records
In 2007 Holman released a CD entitled "The Awesome Whatever" – produced, and with music, by Vito Ricci—on the Bowery Records label.

Poets Theater
Holman has directed and/or produced a steady stream of plays during his career, most of them written by poets. These include:

 Ted Berrigan's "Clear the Range" at St. Clement's Episcopal Church Theater, 1977
 "4 Plays by Edwin Denby" at the Eye and Ear Theater, March 1981
 Ed Friedman's "The White Snake" at the Eye and Ear Theater, May 1982
 W. H. Auden's "Paid on Both Sides", at the Eye and Ear Theater, May 1983
 A series produced at St. Mark's Church between 1988 and 1990 comprising Millicent Dillon's "She Is in Tangiers: Life and Work of Jane Bowles", Vladimir Mayakovsky's "Mayakovsky, a Tragedy," Tristan Tzara's "The Gas Heart", Antonin Artaud's "Jet of Blood", and Holman's own collaboration with Bob Rosenthal, "The Cause of Gravity"/"The Whore of the Alpines"/"Bicentennial Suicide."
 D. Zhonzinsky's "Stop at Nothing" at The Kitchen, 1992
 Pedro Pietri's "Eat Rocks" at New Dramatists NYC
 Ed Sanders's "A Night at the Rebel Café" at the Bowery Poetry Club, 2003

At WNYC-TV and WNYC-FM
Between 1987 and 1993 Holman was the producer and host of "Poetry Spots" for WNYC-TV, a public television station in New York City. In a foreshadowing of the technique used in "The United States of Poetry," each "Poetry Spot" was a short film built around a single poet performing a poem. The "Poetry Spots" series won New York Emmy Awards in 1989 and 1992.

In 2004–2005, Holman was Poet-in-Residence at WNYC-FM, a storied public radio station in New York City.

Nuyo Records/Mouth Almighty Records
In 1994 Holman, Sekou Sundiata, Bill Adler and Jim Coffman co-founded NuYo Records, a record label devoted to the spoken word. Its first two releases, distributed in conjunction with Imago Records, included "Grand Slam: Best of the National Poetry Slam"

This venture was revived in 1996 as Mouth Almighty Records under the auspices of Mercury Records. Over the course of the next three years the label released 18 titles, including recordings by the Last Poets, Allen Ginsberg, and Sekou Sundiata, two CDs of short fiction from The New Yorker magazine, and a two-CD set of readings of Edgar Allan Poe produced by Hal Willner. Mouth Almighty's four-CD box set of readings by William Burroughs, produced by the poet John Giorno, was nominated for a Grammy Award in 1999.

In 1997, the Mouth Almighty slam team, coached by Holman, won the National Poetry Slam.

In 1998 Mouth Almighty released Holman's own "In With the Out Crowd," produced by Hal Willner.

"United States of Poetry"
In 1996 Holman, director Mark Pellington, and producer Joshua Blum teamed up to create "The United States of Poetry," a critically acclaimed five-part PBS television series.  The program featured over 60 poets, rappers, cowboy poets, American Sign Language poets and Slammers. In a review for The New York Times, John J. O'Connor wrote, "Wandering all over the map, geographical and literary, 'The United States of Poetry' unabashedly celebrates the Word.  These days, that's downright courageous." Identified as "the brainchild of Bob Holman," the series is described as "an excellent presentation of 20th Century poetry" on the website of the Academy of American Poets.

The television series was accompanied into the market-place by a book and a soundtrack recording.  The book, published by Abrams Books, was co-edited by Holman, Pellington, and Blum, with an introduction by Holman.

The soundtrack, underscored with music by tomandandy, was issued by Mouth Almighty Records.  In a review for 'The New York Times', Stephen Holden wrote, "The [soundtrack] illustrates how thoroughly the lines between literature and popular culture have dissolved over the last 40 years."

Teaching positions
Among Holman's first teaching jobs was a stint in July 1991 at the Jack Kerouac School of Disembodied Poetics, which had been founded at the Naropa Institute in Boulder, Colorado by Chogyam Trungpa, Allen Ginsberg and Anne Waldman in 1974.  Holman's course was entitled "From Rap to Zap." Between 1993 and 1996 Holman was a Professor of Writing at The New School for Social Research, and from 1998 through 2002 a Visiting Professor of Writing and Integrated Arts at Bard College. In 2003 Holman relocated to Columbia University's School of the Arts where, as a Visiting Professor of Writing, he taught the graduate course "Exploding Text: Poetry Performance." In 2007, as a Visiting Professor at New York University's Tisch School of the Arts, Holman began teaching a course called "Art and the Public Sphere." From 2010 to 2016, Holman suspended his teaching activities to focus on the Endangered Language Alliance. Holman taught his oral poetry syllabus "Exploding Text: Poetry and Performance" at Princeton University in the fall of 2017.

Endangered Language Activism

Endangered Language Alliance
In 2010, in cooperation with linguists Daniel Kaufman and Juliette Blevins, Holman founded the Endangered Language Alliance.  The work, he says, comprises a mission:  "We are so in awe of the power of the book that we've forgotten the power of sound and the magic of sense nested in sound. Everybody's fighting for the preservation of species, but who's fighting for the preservation of languages, which are in fact the souls...of culture itself?" The project has so far generated "On the Road With Bob Holman:  A Poet's Journey Into Global Cultures and Languages," a three-part documentary DVD focused on West Africa and Israel. Bob Holman features on Welsh artist Gai Toms' 2012 album Bethel, on which he performs an improvised scat.

KHONSAY: Poem of Many Tongues
In 2015, with City Lore's Steve Zeitlin as producer, Holman directed the poetry film KHONSAY: Poem of Many Tongues. Supported by the NEA and NYSCA, KHONSAY documents 50 speakers of endangered, minority, or treasure languages in the cento form, with one line from each speaker.

Language Matters with Bob Holman
Produced by David Grubin, Language Matters with Bob Holman aired nationally on PBS in January 2015. The documentary film focuses upon the rapid extinction of many of planet Earth's human languages and the multifarious struggles and efforts to save and preserve them. Holman states that "There are between 6,000 and 7,000 languages spoken in the world today. Languages have always come and gone but what is happening today is "a global crisis of massive proportions."

In his review for the journal Literary Kicks, Levi Asher called Language Matters "a delightful and captivating two-hour documentary...Language Matters appears to be a television documentary about remote cultures and faraway peoples. It turns out to be a show about us all."

In 2015,Alonzo Holman was awarded Ford Foundation funding to tour Language Matters throughout Alaska, and to organize poetry workshops that included speakers of Alaska's Native Languages. The screening tour and workshops were detailed by Holman in a chapter in "Language and Globalization: An Autoethnographic Approach", edited by Maryam Borjian and due for publication by Routledge in 2017.

LINES Ballet Collaboration
Holman is currently creative consultant to Alonzo King's LINES Ballet company, who are producing a ballet inspired by endangered languages which will be performed in spring 2017.

Bob Holman Audio/Video Poetry Collection

New York University's Fales Library is the home of The Bob Holman Audio/Video Poetry Collection, a multimedia collection documenting spoken word performances and productions between the years 1977 and 2002.  Key items include spoken word projects featuring and/or produced by Holman himself. Marvin Taylor, director of the Fales Library, has said Holman's collection "is a magnificent resource for anyone who cares about New York's spoken word scene during the last 40 years.  No one else has such documentation."

Collaboration With Musicians 
Holman performs poetry on a periodic basis with griot and kora player Papa Susso.

In June 2017, Holman performed with Serhiy Zhadan as part of the show "1917–2017: Tychyna, Zhadan and The Dogs" at the La MaMa Experimental Theatre Club, directed by Virlana Tkacz.

Filmography
 The United States Of Poetry, (Directed by Mark Pellington), PBS, 1995
 On The Road With Bob Holman, Rattapallax, 201,
 Witness Downtown Rising Renga, (Directed by Nikhil Melnechuk), 2012,
 KHONSAY: Poem of Many Tongues, (Directed by Bob Holman and Produced by Steve Zeitlin), 2015
 Language Matters With Bob Holman, (Directed by David Grubin) PBS, 2015

Bibliography

 Bicenntential Suicide: a novel to be performed, w/ Bob Rosenthal, Frontward Books, 1976.
  The Rainbow Raises Its Shoulder/When a Flower Grows, Chinatown Planning Council, 1979
 Tear to Open: This this this this this this, Power Mad Press, 1979.
  8 Chinese Poems, Peeka Boo Press, 1981
  SWEAT&SEX&Politics!, Peeka Boo Press, 1981
 PANIC*DJ: Performance Text, Poems Raps Songs, Larry Qualls and Associates/University Arts Resources, 1988.
 Cupid's Cashbox (with drawings by Elizabeth Murray), Jordan Davies, 1988.
 Aloud: Voices From The Nuyorican Poets Cafe, (Co-edited with Miguel Algarín), Holt Paperbacks, 1994
 Bob Holman's The Collect Call of the Wild, John Macrae/Henry Holt & Company, 1995.
 Beach Simplifies Horizon (with illustrations by Robert Moskowitz), The Grenfell Press, 1998.
 Picasso in Barcelona, Paper Kite Press, 2011
 Crossing State Lines: An American Renga, (Co-edited with Carol Muske-Dukes), Farrar, Stauss and Giroux, 2011
 A Couple of Ways of Doing Something (a collaboration with Chuck Close), Aperture, 2006.
 Sing This One Back To Me, Coffee House Press, 2013.
 The Cutouts (Matisse), Peek A Boo Press, 2017

Personal life
Holman was married to artist Elizabeth Murray until her death in 2007. The couple had two daughters, both born in the early 1980s: Sophia Murray Holman and Daisy Murray Holman.

References

External links

Bowery Poetry Club
The Fales Library Guide to the Bob Holman Audio/Video Poetry Collection
Bob Holman on discogs.com

1948 births
Living people
Columbia College (New York) alumni
Slam poets
American spoken word poets
American male poets
Bard College faculty
People from Harlan, Kentucky
Poets from Kentucky
Poets from Ohio
20th-century American poets
20th-century American male writers
21st-century American poets
21st-century American male writers
People from LaFollette, Tennessee